Jajur is a village in the Akhuryan Municipality of the Shirak Province of Armenia. The village was established in 1828 when a lime extraction facility was established near by.

Demographics

References 

Populated places in Shirak Province